The Fallujah killings of April 2003 began when United States Army soldiers from the American 1st Battalion, 325th Infantry Regiment of the 82nd Airborne Division fired into a crowd of Iraqi civilians who were protesting their presence at a school within the city of Fallujah. Human Rights Watch, which inspected the area after the incident, found no physical evidence of shots fired at the building where U.S. forces were based.

History

On the evening of April 28, 2003, several hundred civilians ignored a curfew imposed on them by the U.S. military. They proceeded to march through the streets of Fallujah, past the soldiers positioned in the Ba'ath party headquarters. They wished to protest outside a local school about the United States military presence within. A U.S. Army Psychological Operations team attempted to force the civilians to disperse with announcements, but the team failed in this attempt. According to locals, at this point the United States soldiers fired upon the unarmed crowd, killing 17 and wounding more than 70 of the protesters. The U.S. suffered no casualties from the incident. According to the soldiers on the ground, the 82nd Airborne soldiers inside the school responded to "effective fire" from inside the protesting crowd. Human Rights Watch, based solely upon the absence of bullet holes in the school building, though troops were also on the ground and in vehicles, declared it had found no evidence that the US forces had come under attack and it concluded that the US forces, far from shooting with precision, shot at Iraqis indiscriminately. Two days later, on April 30, the 82nd Airborne was replaced in the city by 2nd Troop (Fox) / U.S. 3rd Armored Cavalry Regiment. The 3rd Cavalry was significantly smaller in number and chose not to occupy the same schoolhouse where the shooting had occurred two days earlier. 

However, on the same day three more unarmed civilians were killed by United States soldiers during a daytime protest in front of the Ba'ath party headquarters and mayor's office (which are adjacent to one another; known collectively to U.S. forces as FOB Laurie). Once again, the U.S. suffered no casualties from the incident but some U.S. soldiers were hurt in a retaliatory grenade attack on the Ba'ath headquarters later that evening.

Legacy
The incident is frequently cited and compared to other similar incidents. Foreign Policy compared Fallujah to the 2010 Israeli Gaza flotilla raid during which Israeli naval commandos used lethal force to kill nine activists, some shot when they had their backs turned to the Israeli soldiers.

See also
 Rules of Engagement, a 2000 film displaying a similar incident, albeit of U.S. Marines under perceived attack from a supposedly hostile crowd

References

External links
U.S. Troops Fire on Iraqi Protesters, Leaving 15 Dead
Human Rights Watch: IV. April 28 School Protest and Shooting
Pictures of the massacre at Fallujah, Iraq  30 April 2003
Iraqi rage grows after Fallujah massacre
Violent Response: The U.S. Army in Al-Falluja

2003 in Iraq
Mass murder in 2003
Occupation of Iraq
Civilian casualties in the Iraq War
Massacres in Iraq
Massacres committed by the United States
April 2003 events in Iraq